Die Zeitung (English: The Times) was a German-language newspaper in London published during World War II. It had an average circulation of 15,000 to 20,000 from March 1941 to June 1945 and was read for the most part by anti-Nazi members of the German diaspora. A lighter version was sold overseas and airdropped over Nazi Germany by the Royal Air Force.

The paper mainly covered news about the ongoing war and the situation in Nazi Germany. In its first issue the paper claimed it was the only free and uncensored German-language newspaper left in Europe.

See also 
 Exilliteratur

References

External links
 Archive of all or most issues by the Deutsche Nationalbibliothek (in German)
 Digitized editions 1941-1945 of Die Zeitung (B513) at the Leo Baeck Institute, New York

German-language newspapers published in Europe
Political newspapers published in the United Kingdom
Weekly newspapers published in the United Kingdom
Exilliteratur
Newspapers established in 1941
Publications disestablished in 1945
Newspapers published in London